Rugby union is a minor, but developing sport in Jordan.

Governing body
Jordanian rugby is administered by Jordan Rugby, which has been recognized by the Jordan Olympic Committee since 2007.

History
Rugby was first introduced into Jordan by the British. Since then, it has mainly been played by expatriates from the British Commonwealth and foreign workers.

Jordan maintains a close relationship with AGRFU, and their development team includes Ghaith Jalajel, a Jordanian.

The Dubai Sevens has also helped stir up some interest in the sport in Arabic-speaking nations. Jordanian rugby has its own sevens and rugby 15s leagues that consists of Citadel Warriors RFC, Citadel Knights RFC, Nomads RFC, Amman Saracens and Aqaba Sharks.

Lowest rugby match
Jordan has hosted a rugby match at the lowest altitude ever recorded - at over 400 metres below sea level on the eastern shore of the Dead Sea on 29 October 1982. This was between a team representing Aqaba and Safi and another representing Amman. The temperature at the time, was in the 90s (fahrenheit).

National team
The Jordan national rugby union team is a third tier rugby playing international side. Jordan played their first test match against  on 14 May 2010, in Dubai. They competed in and won the inaugural Asian 5 nations division 3 West competition in 2016.

Rugby clubs in Jordan
There are three clubs in Amman:
 Nomads Rugby Club
 Amman Citadel Rugby Club
 Amman Saracens
 Sosruka rugby
Outside Amman:
 Aqaba Sharks

References
 Cotton, Fran (Ed.) (1984) The Book of Rugby Disasters & Bizarre Records. Compiled by Chris Rhys. London. Century Publishing. 
 Richards, Huw A Game for Hooligans: The History of Rugby Union (Mainstream Publishing, Edinburgh, 2007)

External links
 Jordan Rugby Union
 Rugby in Asia, Jordan page
 Asian Rugby Football Union
 "Islam and Rugby" on the Rugby Readers review
 Amman Citadel Rugby Club
 
 

Rugby union in Jordan
Sports competitions in Jordan